Verschollen was a German TV show about a group of people after their plane crashes on an island. It had a run of 28 episodes on RTL Television before being canceled because of low ratings.

External links

The Official Verschollen Site 
Verschollen on RTLNOW  

2004 German television series debuts
2005 German television series endings
German drama television series
German-language television shows
RTL (German TV channel) original programming